Psychophysiological economics is a field of study focused on the assessment and evaluation of psychological and physiological events as factors shaping consumer economic behavior. Psychophysiological economists believe that behavior and cognitive processing are indivisible and that behavioral, cognitive, and physiological tools and techniques can be combined to create interventions that improve the economic well-being of consumers. 

Psychophysiological economics differs from behavioral economics by focusing on direct measures of physiological change and observational data, in addition to attitudinal measurement. Psychophysiological economics also differs from functional magnetic resonance imaging, which is typically applied exclusively to the study of brain activity. Psychophysiological economics emphasizes the role of the peripheral nervous system as it relates to shaping economic behavior. 

The peripheral nervous system includes the spinal and cranial nerves. Of specific relevance is the Autonomic Nervous System (ANS). The ANS regulates glands and other internal organs (visceral structures). Visceral structures control involuntary physiological activities and behavior. Psychophysiological economics researchers directly measure the sympathetic nervous system  as a person responds to stressor within the environment.

Assumptions
Three assumptions provide the basis for psychophysiological economics studies. First, stress shapes how consumers react, both physically and mentally, to economic challenges (i.e., stressors). Second, stress cannot be evaluated and assessed easily using traditional observational methods. Third, both eustress (positive stress) and distress (negative stress) can alter behavior by causing changes in a person’s visceral structures. These changes occur involuntarily, but the underlying cause can be measured and evaluated.

Scope
As a new field of study, psychophysiological economics tends to be focused on evaluating and assessing physiological aspects of economic behavior. Clinical and experimental  research uses the following tools to evaluate stress responses:

Cardiovascular activity: heart rate variability
Electrodermal activity: skin conductance
Peripheral skin temperature: sympathetic activation (sympathetic nervous system)
Respiratory feedback: breathing patterns
Surface electromyography: muscle tension patterns (muscle tone)

These tools allow Psychophysiological Economics researchers to evaluate directly, in real time, the relationship between cognition and economic behavior. In general, someone experiencing economic stress (either acute or chronic) should exhibit the following characteristics as they relate to any given economic stressor: (a) muscle tension, (b) increased sweat production, (c) a decrease in peripheral skin temperature, (d) increased breathing, and (e) increased heart rate variability. For those who are experiencing economic stress, specific interventions can be used to reduce such stress. A good source of papers on the topic can be found in the Journal of Financial Therapy.

See also
 Money disorders

References

Interdisciplinary subfields of economics
Physiological psychology